"Footsteps" is a hit single by the American singer and actor Steve Lawrence, recorded in January 1960 and released in spring 1960 by ABC-Paramount Records in the US and HMV in the UK. The song was written by Barry Mann and Hank Hunter. 

The single has Lawrence's wife, Eydie Gormé, as a backing vocalist and Don Costa's Orchestra and chorus.

Charts
In the US, it spent 13 weeks on the Billboard Hot 100, peaking at No. 7 on April 4, 1960, while reaching No. 4 in the Record Retailer chart in the UK, No. 3 in the CHUM Hit Parade in Canada, and No. 9 on VG-lista in Norway.

Cover versions
It was also a hit for Ronnie Carroll in 1960, peaking at No. 36 in the UK. 
Showaddywaddy released their version of the song in 1981, peaking at No. 31 in the UK.

References

1960 songs
1960 singles
1981 singles
Steve Lawrence songs
Showaddywaddy songs
Songs written by Barry Mann